Dănuț Ion Moldovan (born 18 March 1991) is an Austrian and former Romanian bobsledder.

Career
Moldovan competed at the 2014 Winter Olympics for Romania. He teamed with driver Andreas Neagu, Paul Muntean, Florin Cezar Crăciun and Bogdan Laurentiu Otavă in the four-man event, finishing 24th.

As of April 2014, his best showing at the World Championships is 26th, coming in the four-man event in 2013.

Moldovan made his World Cup debut in November 2012. As of April 2014, his best finish is 16th, in a four-man event in 2012–13 at Winterberg.

References

External links

1991 births
Living people
Olympic bobsledders of Romania
Olympic bobsledders of Austria
Sportspeople from Bucharest
Bobsledders at the 2014 Winter Olympics
Bobsledders at the 2018 Winter Olympics
Romanian male bobsledders
Austrian male bobsledders